Pascal Broulis (born 3 April 1965 in Sainte-Croix, Vaud) is a Swiss politician.  Since 2002, he has been a member of the Council of State in the canton of Vaud.  He heads the cantonal finance department, and has been the President of the Council of State since 2007.

Broulis was elected to Vaud's legislature, the Grand Council, in 1990, as a member of the Free Democratic Party.

He's the fourth candidate to the succession of Pascal Couchepin in the Swiss Federal Council.

References

External links 
 Pascal Broulis's official website

1965 births
Living people
People from Jura-North Vaudois District
FDP.The Liberals politicians